People's Police may refer to:
 People's Police of the People's Republic of China branches:
 Public Security Organs People's Police
 State Security Organs People's Police
 Judicial Administrative Organs  People's Police
 People's Courts Judicial Police
 People's Procuratorates Judicial Police
 People's Police Force, the official name of the Myanmar Police Force
 Vietnam People's Police Force, a branch of Vietnam People's Public Security
 Volkspolizei, national police of the German Democratic Republic (East Germany)

 a book by Norman Spinrad